Robert Camden Cope (1771 – 5 December 1818) was a British politician from Loughgall, County Armagh in Ireland. He sat in the First Parliament of the United Kingdom.

Life 
Educated at Trinity Hall, Cambridge, Cope was elected in Armagh with Archibald Acheson at the 1801 general election.

He died in 1818 and is buried at St Mary's Church, Weymouth.

Personal life 
He was the grandson of former MP Robert Cope. He was the nephew of Anthony Cope, the former Dean of Armagh.

References

External links 
Burial

See also 

 Cope family

1771 births
1810s deaths
Year of death uncertain
Independent members of the House of Commons of the United Kingdom
People from County Armagh
UK MPs 1801–1802
Alumni of Trinity Hall, Cambridge
18th-century Irish politicians
19th-century Irish politicians
Members of the Parliament of the United Kingdom for County Armagh constituencies (1801–1922)